The Emirates Towers is a building complex in Dubai that contains the Emirates Office Tower and Jumeirah Emirates Towers Hotel, which are connected by a  two-story retail complex known as "The Boulevard". The building is owned by Sheikh Mohammed Bin Rashid Al Maktoum. The Emirates Towers complex is located on the Sheikh Zayed Road in Dubai, United Arab Emirates, and is a symbol of the city of Dubai. The Emirates Office Tower was constructed by the construction wing of Al Ghurair Investment group and the Emirates Hotel Tower was built by Ssangyong and BESIX subsidiary Six Construct. The hotel has 400 rooms.

A curiosity of the design is that the towers have a similar number of floors; the taller office tower actually contains 56 floors above ground, while the hotel tower contains 54 floors. This is because the individual floor heights of the office tower are greater than that of the hotel. The building also contains 17 elevators inside.

There is parking space for up to 1,500 cars.

For a period of time, these towers were the tallest buildings in Dubai.

In 2019, Marcus Sutton was appointed General Manager of the Jumeirah Emirates Towers.
|}

References

External links

 Emirates Tower One on CTBUH Skyscraper Center
 Emirates Tower Two on CTBUH Skyscraper Center

Twin towers
Postmodern architecture in Dubai
Skyscraper hotels in Dubai
Skyscraper office buildings in Dubai